KLDQ (100.7 FM) is a radio station in Fargo, North Dakota (licensed to Harwood, North Dakota), broadcasting the K-LOVE radio network, airing a contemporary Christian music format.

Translators

History
The station signed on in 2001 as KGBZ with an 80's rock format known as "The Buzz", owned and operated by Tom Ingstad. The Buzz also aired Loveline and Bob and Tom.

KGBZ switched to a smooth jazz in 2003 as "FM Smooth Jazz", along with adopting the KDJZ call sign.

Educational Media Foundation purchased KDJZ in 2004, and became a full-time K-LOVE network affiliate, along with changing the call sign to KKLQ to reflect K-LOVE. In 2007, KKLQ resolved its limited signal issue in the eastern Fargo-Moorhead area by signing on a translator K257EP 99.3 FM in Dilworth, Minnesota. Translator K237ER 95.3 FM also signed on in Grand Forks, North Dakota weeks later.

On November 8, 2017, EMF filed to use the KKLQ call sign for their new K-LOVE affiliate at 100.3 in Los Angeles and slated KLDQ to be the new call sign for the 100.7 frequency. The change took effect on November 16, 2017.

References

External links
K-LOVE

LDQ
K-Love radio stations
Contemporary Christian radio stations in the United States
Radio stations established in 2001
2001 establishments in North Dakota
Educational Media Foundation radio stations
LDQ